Catterick Camp railway station was a railway station in what is now the Richmondshire district of North Yorkshire, England. It was built as the terminus of the sub branch of the Eryholme-Richmond branch line to serve Catterick Camp, now Catterick Garrison. Along with the rest of the stations on the branch it was closed in 1964.

On  15 September 1917, a set of carriages ran away from the station and were derailed. Three people were killed.

References

Source

External links
 Camp Centre, Catterick Camp, Sub Brit disused stations project

Disused railway stations in North Yorkshire
Railway stations in Great Britain opened in 1915
Railway stations in Great Britain closed in 1964
Catterick Garrison